A Transatmospheric Orbit (TAO) is an orbit around a celestial body in which the perigee of the orbit intersects with the defined atmosphere. Transatmospheric Earth orbits generally use the FAI defined Kármán line to differentiate between transatmospheric Earth orbits or low Earth orbits but altitudes such as the U.S. defined 50 mi (80 km) line may be used. Such orbits are subject to significant atmospheric drag, causing rapid orbital decay if left unchecked.

A number of artificial satellites have been placed into transatmospheric Earth orbits, usually due to a launch vehicle malfunction. Such satellites include EOS 02 and AzaadiSAT, which were deployed into a 76 km x 356 km (47 mi x 221 mi) transatmospheric orbit due to an upper stage malfunction on the SSLV rocket. Transatmospheric orbits have limited practical applications because object placed into such orbits are subject to rapid orbital decay. One such application was used to test the reentry of the IXV spacecraft. It was launched into a 76 km x 416 orbit (47 mi x 258 mi) transatmospheric orbit.

References 

Earth orbits
Orbits